Urochaeta is a genus of South American earthworm.

References 

Clitellata